Márton Lovászy (6 November 1864 – 21 August 1927) was a Hungarian politician, who served as Minister of Foreign Affairs in 1919. He was one of the leaders of the Independent Party during the Austro-Hungarian Monarchy. He did not support the First World War and the alliance with the German Empire. He published an article in his newspaper (Magyarország) which welcomed the breaking of the October Revolution in the Russian Empire.

Lovászy participated in the Aster Revolution. He was a member of the National Council and served as Minister of Religion and Education in the Mihály Károlyi administration. After that he retired from the politics, because he disapproved the additional procession of the revolution. He lived in Vienna for a short time. Then he returned and István Friedrich appointed him Minister of Foreign Affairs. Lovászy didn't agree with Miklós Horthy's politics so he emigrated to the Kingdom of Yugoslavia. He often attacked the Hungarian system in his articles and his speeches. The public prosecutor's department took an indictment out against him in 1925. He was permitted to return home with the condition that he withdraws from political life. Lovászy died soon afterwards.

References
 Magyar Életrajzi Lexikon

1864 births
1927 deaths
People from Senta
Foreign ministers of Hungary
Education ministers of Hungary